Bernard Saugey (born 3 March 1943) is a French politician who served as a member of the Senate of France between 2001 and 2017, representing the Isère department. He is a member of the Union for a Popular Movement.

References
Page on the Senate website

1943 births
Living people
Union for a Popular Movement politicians
French Senators of the Fifth Republic
Senators of Isère
Place of birth missing (living people)
21st-century French politicians